Jang Song-man (장성만 born 17 August 1985) is a North Korean table tennis player. He competed for North Korea at the 2008 and 2012 Summer Olympics, in the men's individual and men's team event respectively.

References

External links
 

North Korean male table tennis players
Table tennis players at the 2008 Summer Olympics
Table tennis players at the 2012 Summer Olympics
Olympic table tennis players of North Korea
1985 births
Living people
Asian Games medalists in table tennis
Table tennis players at the 2010 Asian Games
Medalists at the 2010 Asian Games
Asian Games bronze medalists for North Korea
21st-century North Korean people